Marije Oosterhuis (born 21 June 1995) is a Dutch Paralympic swimmer who competes in international-level events. She has competed at the 2012 and 2016 Summer Paralympics. She developed synovial sarcoma in her right thigh in 2008 and she swims with only her left leg.

References

1995 births
Living people
People from Delfzijl
Paralympic swimmers of the Netherlands
Swimmers at the 2012 Summer Paralympics
Swimmers at the 2016 Summer Paralympics
Dutch female backstroke swimmers
S10-classified Paralympic swimmers
Sportspeople from Groningen (province)
21st-century Dutch women